Leonardo II Tocco (1375/76 – 1418/19) was a scion of the Tocco family and lord of Zakynthos, who played an important role as a military leader for his brother, Carlo I Tocco, in early 15th-century western Greece.

Biography 
Leonardo was the second son and youngest child of Leonardo I Tocco, the Count palatine of the islands of Cephalonia and Zakynthos and lord of Ithaca and Leucas, and his wife, Maddalena dei Buondelmonti. His older siblings were Carlo I Tocco and Petronila, wife of Nicola Venier, the Venetian bailli of Negroponte.

Leonardo's father died while he was still an infant, and for the next few years, his mother acted as regent for both her sons. His brother Carlo I gave the island of Zakynthos to him as an appanage in 1399, and Leonardo also received lands in the Principality of Achaea by Prince Pedro de San Superano. Little is known of him otherwise until ca. 1404–1406, when he took part in Carlo's attacks on the Epirote mainland around Arta. Leonardo's and Carlo's exploits over the next decades are the main subject of the Chronicle of the Tocco. In 1407, Leonardo attacked the new Prince of Achaea, Centurione II Zaccaria, who had seized his fiefs in the Morea in 1404, and conquered Glarentza, the principality's main town.

In 1411 Carlo took possession of Ioannina in Epirus following the death of the Despot of Epirus Esau de' Buondelmonti; Leonardo too joined his brother there, and in the same summer he conquered and razed the Albanian-held fortress of Lachanokastron. In the next year, however, he was defeated by the Albanians at Kranea near Mesopotamon. In 1413, warfare between the Tocchi and Centurione Zaccaria resumed, and this time the latter prevailed. Leonardo campaigned against Zaccaria in 1413, but in summer 1414, he was sent by Carlo to Corinth, where the Byzantine emperor Manuel II Palaiologos supervised repairs to the Hexamilion wall. The emperor awarded Leonardo with the high court dignity of megas konostaulos, but enjoined both brothers to seek peace with Zaccaria. The brothers appealed to Venice, and with her mediation concluded three-year truce was agreed which left Glarentza once again under Achaean control.

Carlo now appointed his brother as governor over the Tocco-ruled islands as well as Acarnania with Vonitsa. On 4 October 1416, Leonardo conquered the town of Rogoi. This was followed soon after by the capture of Arta by his brother, and Leonardo was appointed the city's governor. In 1418, he fought against the attacks of the Ottoman Turks, and visited King Ladislaus of Naples. He died soon after at Zakynthos.

Family 
The name and identity of Leonardo's wife is unknown, but he had several children:
 Carlo II Tocco, who succeeded his uncle Carlo I
 Maddalena Tocco, who in 1429 married the Despot of the Morea (and future last Byzantine emperor), Constantine XI Palaiologos
 Angelica Tocco, who married Giacomo de Ariano
 Creusa Tocco, who married Centurione II Zaccaria

References

Sources 

 
 
 
 
 

1370s births
1410s deaths
Tocco family
County palatine of Cephalonia and Zakynthos
Despotate of Epirus
History of Zakynthos
Lords of the Crusader states
History of Aetolia-Acarnania
14th-century Venetian people
15th-century Venetian people
Megaloi konostauloi